The Curculionidae are a family of weevils, commonly called snout beetles or true weevils. They are one of the largest animal families with 6,800 genera and 83,000 species described worldwide. They are the sister group to the family Brentidae.

They include the bark beetles as the subfamily Scolytinae, which are modified  in shape in accordance with their wood-boring lifestyle. They do not much resemble other weevils, so they were traditionally considered a distinct family, Scolytidae. The family also includes the ambrosia beetles, of which the present-day subfamily Platypodinae was formerly considered the distinct family Platypodidae.

Description
Adult Curculionidae can be recognised by the well-developed, downwards-curved snout (rostrum) possessed by many species, though the rostrum is sometimes short (e.g. Entiminae). They have elbowed antennae that end in clubs, and the first antennal segment often fits into a groove in the side of the rostrum. The body tends to be robust, convex, heavily sclerotised and covered in scales or bristles. Curculionidae range in size from 1-35 mm long, usually being 5-15 mm long. Most Curculionidae are sexually dimorphic with females (compared to males) having antennae positioned more basally and a longer, thinner rostrum.

Larval Curculionidae are C-shaped and lightly sclerotised, with minute antennae and robust mandibles. They almost always lack legs, except in some basal taxa.

Most weevils feed on plants as larvae and adults, and they include important pests of cultivated plants that chew holes in fruits, nuts and other parts. The long rostrum possessed by most adult weevils is used by females to help lay eggs (oviposit) inside plant tissue. Some feed on rotten wood or bark (e.g. Cossoninae and Cryptorhynchinae), and some are wood-borers that feed on ambrosia fungi (Platypodinae and some Scolytinae).
Although pesticide resistance hasn't historically been an issue with these insects, recently a mutation was discovered in association with the voltage-gated sodium channel in the species Sitophilus zeamais, indicating there is a lot to learn about how these insects adapt to changing environments.

Behavior
When disturbed, adult curculionids often play dead by lying motionless on their backs.

Many species of weevils are common household and garden pests, but don't harm people, pets, or buildings. Their presence is more of a temporary nuisance. In tropical areas they have larger effects, specifically several species in the genera Conotrachelus and Copturus.

Cylas formicarius has been observed with an increased amount of inbreeding suppression than is normal for the average population of weevils, both intraspecific and interspecific.

Phylogeny and systematics
The phylogeny of the group is complex; with so many species, a spirited debate exists about the relationships between subfamilies and genera. A 1997 analysis attempted to construct a phylogeny based mainly on larval characteristics.

Recent work on the phylogenetic relationships in weevils mentions the two subfamily groups Adelognatha (short-nosed weevils, subfamily Entiminae) and Phanerognatha (long-nosed weevils, subfamilies of Curculionidae other than Entiminae) for the species of Curculionidae.

Almost two dozen subfamilies are recognized by some authors even when merging those that are certainly invalid. Others, however, recognize a lesser number – the only subfamilies that are almost universally considered valid are the Baridinae, Cossoninae, Curculioninae, Cyclominae, Entiminae, Molytinae, Platypodinae, and Scolytinae. The various proposed taxonomic schemes typically recognize as many additional subfamilies again, but little agreement is seen between authorities about which. In particular, the delimitation of the Molytinae has proven difficult.

The timeline for current and extant weevil speciation and diversification is consistent with the radiation of gymnosperms during the Mesozoic period.

The subfamilies considered valid by at least some authors today:
 Bagoinae (sometimes in Molytinae)
 Baridinae
 Brachycerinae (disputed)
 Conoderinae (sometimes in Baridinae)
 Cossoninae
 Cryptorhynchinae (sometimes in Curculioninae)
 Acalles
 Curculioninae – flower weevils, acorn and nut weevils
 Cyclominae
 Dryophthorinae (sometimes placed at family level)
 Entiminae – broad-nosed weevils
 Etheridgea (disputed)
 Hyperinae (sometimes in Molytinae)
 Lixinae (sometimes in Molytinae)
 Mesoptiliinae (sometimes in Molytinae)
 Molytinae
 Orobitidinae (sometimes in Baridinae)
 Platypodinae – typical ambrosia beetles, "higher" Curculionidaes
 Raymondionyminae (sometimes in Brachycerinae)
 Scolytinae – bark beetles
 Xiphaspidinae (sometimes in Baridinae)

See also 

 Black vine weevil
 Boll weevil
 Pecan weevil
 Wheat weevil
 Hylobius
 Orthorhinus cylindrirostris
 Premnotrypes
 Scolytoplatypus
 Pests and diseases of roses

References

External links
 
 

 
Insect vectors of plant pathogens
Beetle families
Articles containing video clips